Albert Edwin Hawksley Sangwine (16 March 1901 – 3 November 1962) was an English freestyle sport wrestler who competed for Great Britain in the 1924 Summer Olympics.

He was born in Tottenham and died in Chingford.

In 1924 he finished tenth in the freestyle heavyweight tournament.

At the 1930 Empire Games he won the silver medal in the freestyle heavyweight class.

References

External links
 postalheritage.org.uk

1901 births
1962 deaths
People from Tottenham
Sportspeople from London
Wrestlers at the 1930 British Empire Games
Commonwealth Games silver medallists for England
Olympic wrestlers of Great Britain
Wrestlers at the 1924 Summer Olympics
British male sport wrestlers
Commonwealth Games medallists in wrestling
Medallists at the 1930 British Empire Games